State Road 234 exists in two sections in Indiana.  The western portion begins at the Illinois border from a Vermilion County, Illinois, county road.  It runs east from there to U.S. Route 136 (US 136) near Jamestown.  Much of the route is a scenic, two-lane road with very tight turns.
The primary access to Shades State Park is located along SR 234.

Its eastern portion goes from the U.S. Route 36/State Road 67 concurrency in McCordsville, Indiana.  The eastern terminus is at an intersection with State Road 38.

Route description

Western section 
From the western terminus SR 234 heads east towards Cayuga.  SR 234 passes through Cayuga and heads east towards Kingman.  East of Kingman SR 234 has an intersection with U.S. Route 41.  SR 234 heads east then southeast towards Ladoga, passing through intersections with State Road 341, State Road 47, and U.S. Route 231.  SR 234 heads east towards Jamestown, where SR 234 has a concurrency with State Road 75.  The concurrency end at the eastern terminus of the western section.

Eastern section 
From US 36/SR 67, SR 234 heads due east towards Kennard, passing through intersection with State Road 9 and State Road 109. The eastern terminus is soon after at SR 38.

History 
A middle section of SR 234 existed in Indiana between SR 37 in Noblesville Indiana and SR 267 in Boone County Indiana. Its primary job was to provide cities and towns across the northern side of Greater Indianapolis with heavy commerce, but also served as a northern route between SR 37 and SR 267, however with the advent of modern interstates, then its designation was removed in the 1970s. Middle section of SR 234 started at SR 37 in Noblesville Indiana. It ran west along 146th Street, so as to utilize that bridge over White River, then turned south on River Road until it reached 116th Street. At that point, it turned west again and proceeded through Carmel, then Zionsville, and ended on SR 267. Because of its proximity to many places, then it supplied heavy commerce to areas such as; Noblesville, Fishers, Carmel, Homeplace, Zionsville, Whitestown and Fayette. Many locals still use the old route to avoid the traffic of heavy commerce.

Major intersections

References

External links

Indiana Highway Ends - SR 234

234
Transportation in Boone County, Indiana
Transportation in Hancock County, Indiana
Transportation in Fountain County, Indiana
Transportation in Henry County, Indiana
Transportation in Parke County, Indiana
Transportation in Montgomery County, Indiana
Transportation in Vermillion County, Indiana